Maritsa is a rural locality and the administrative center of Maritsky Selsoviet Rural Settlement, Lgovsky District, Kursk Oblast, Russia. Population:

Geography 
The village is located on the Prutishche River in the basin of the Seym, 59 km from the Russia–Ukraine border, 64 km west of Kursk, 10 km north of the district center – the town Lgov.

 Climate
Maritsa has a warm-summer humid continental climate (Dfb in the Köppen climate classification).

Transport 
There is a railway halt Maritsa within the locality limits (railway line Navlya – Lgov-Kiyevsky).

The rural locality is situated 70 km from Kursk Vostochny Airport, 153 km from Belgorod International Airport and 273 km from Voronezh Peter the Great Airport.

References

Notes

Sources

Rural localities in Lgovsky District